Club Always Ready, better known as Always Ready, is a Bolivian football club from La Paz which plays its home games in nearby El Alto. Due to the jerseys the team is also known as Banda Roja, or the red band.

History

Club Always Ready was founded on 13 April 1933. The team took part in the La Paz championship, which was held in 1950 under semi-professional conditions; it was organized by La Paz Football Association (LPFA). Despite not having any official status, the winner of the tournament was widely considered the de facto champion of Bolivia. Always Ready earned their first title in 1951. In the following two years, the team was runner-up.

From 1954 onwards, teams from Cochabamba and Oruro participated in the now-called Torneo Integrado, a much larger tournament than the La Paz championship; Always Ready found themselves withdrawing from the competition as it found it difficult to retain key players. Always Ready's resurgence was not until 1956. The team secured its second national title in 1957 for the last time.

Always Ready was the first Bolivian team to do a tour outside Bolivia: from August to November 1961, the club toured Europe.

In 1967, the club obtained second place in its national league; that allowed Always Ready to participate in South America's most prestigious club event: the Copa Libertadores. However, the results were disappointing as they went out in the first round without winning a single match. Nevertheless, Always Ready won that same year's city championship and finished 5th in the national standings.

In 1977 Always Ready was one of the founding members of the new national professional league, where it stayed until 1981, when they were relegated to the second division. They achieved promotion in 1987, but in 1991 they descended again and did not reach promotion until 2019, 28 years later.

In 2018, Always Ready returned to the top flight for the first time since 1991 by winning the Copa Simón Bolívar after beating Avilés Industrial 3–0 in the final.

In 2020, Always Ready won the Torneo Apertura championship of the top-flight División Profesional after defeating Nacional Potosí away from home in the last match of the season on December 31.

Always Ready in CONMEBOL competitions 

 Copa Libertadores: 3 appearances
1968 – First Stage
2021 – Group Stage
2022 – Group Stage

Copa Sudamericana: 1 appearance
2020 – First Stage

Honours
División Profesional: 3; 1951, 1957, 2020
Copa Simón Bolívar: 1; 2018

Current squad

References

External links

Final standings in Bolivia – 1950 to 1990
Bolivian Soccer Championship, results and tables
Always cumple 75 años de trayectoria (Spanish)
Siempre listos (Spanish)
SoccerWay Profile

Football clubs in Bolivia
Football clubs in La Paz
Association football clubs established in 1933
1933 establishments in Bolivia